The Almond Blossom Cross Country is an annual international cross country running competition which takes place in Albufeira, in the Algarve region of Portugal, in early March. It is one of the IAAF permit meetings which serve as qualifying events for the IAAF World Cross Country Championships. It is held in co-operation with the Associação de Atletismo do Algarve (Algarve Athletics Association). The race gets its name from the white blossom which appears on the almond trees native to the Algarve region during the spring.

History
The competition was first organised in 1977 through a joint partnership of the Federação Portuguesa de Atletismo (Portuguese Athletics Federation), the District of Faro and Turismo de Portugal, with the aim of promoting both sport and tourism in the region. The race relocated to Vilamoura, another town nearby, in 1996 and the competition remained there until 2003. The 2004 edition was not held due to financial problems, causing the race's annual history to be interrupted for the first time. The Almond Blossom Cross returned to its original home in Albufeira in 2005 and has been held there annually ever since.

The Almond Blossom Cross Country competition is international in its nature, attracting a large number of foreign athletes each year, but it is also a significant draw for Portugal's top domestic runners. Among the past winners in the men's race are Portuguese world medallists Fernando Mamede and Paulo Guerra, track world champion Charles Kamathi, and Serhiy Lebid – a multiple European champion. On the women's side, past winners include Olympic champions Fernanda Ribeiro and Gabriela Szabo, the 1996 World Cross Country champion Gete Wami, and world champion in the 10,000 m Berhane Adere. Only two Portuguese athletes have won at the World Cross Country Championships (Carlos Lopes and Albertina Dias) and both have been victorious in Albufeira: Lopes won the first ever Almond Blossom race in 1977 while Dias won the 1989 women's race.

The Açoteias Cross Country course was also used to host the European Clubs Cross Country Cup in 2008, as it had done a number of times in the 1980s and 1990s. During the Almond Blossom's time in Vilamoura, it served as the tester race for the 2000 IAAF World Cross Country Championships, which was held on the same course a month later. The competition itself was selected in 2010 to host the Portuguese Cross Country Championships, in which Yousef El Kalai and Ana Dulce Félix took the honours in the men's and women's races, respectively. The national competition returned to the race in 2012 and Manuel Damião was the men's Portuguese victor, while Félix again won the women's title. A year later Damião became the first Portuguese man to win the Almond Blossom race itself since 1995 – the invited African contingent (including four-time winner Josphat Kiprono Menjo) did not arrive due to travel issues. The 2014 race again hosted the European Clubs event and Morocco's Mohamed Moustaoui continued to break the Kenya dominance of the men's race.

Past senior race winners

Key:

Distances:

  (10 km for men and 6 km for women where not stated)

Statistics

Winners by country

Multiple winners

References

External links
Algarve Athletics Association website
2014 results

Cross country running competitions
Athletics competitions in Portugal
Recurring sporting events established in 1977
Sport in Algarve
Sport in Albufeira
Cross country running in Portugal
Annual sporting events in Portugal
1977 establishments in Portugal
Spring (season) events in Portugal